The summability criterion is a voting system criterion, used to objectively compare electoral systems. The criterion states:

Each vote should be able to be mapped onto a summable array, such that its size at most grows polynomially with respect to the amount of candidates, the summation operation is associative and commutative and the winner could be determined from the array sum for all votes cast alone.

Summability of various methods

In plurality voting, the number of ballots for each candidate may be counted, and these totals reported from each precinct.

Some other methods that are summable:
 Approval voting
 Baldwin's method
 Borda count
 Bucklin
Majority Judgment
 Nanson
STAR voting
 Schulze method
 Score voting

In approval voting, Borda count, and score voting, each ballot contains votes for more than one candidate, and, with the last two, these votes may have different values. However, the sum of all values for each candidate may be found at each precinct and reported.

With Bucklin voting, the precinct totals for each candidate at each rank may be summed and reported.

In many Condorcet methods, each ballot can be represented as a two-dimensional square array referred to as a pairwise matrix. The sum of these matrices may be reported from each precinct.

Instant-runoff voting does not comply with the summability criterion.

References

See also 

Voting system
Monotonicity criterion
Condorcet winner criterion
Condorcet loser criterion
Smith criterion
Favorite betrayal criterion
Participation criterion

Electoral system criteria